This was the first edition of the tournament.

Sarah Borwell and Courtney Nagle won in the final, defeating Gabriela Chmelinová and Mervana Jugić-Salkić 6-4, 6-4.

Seeds

Draw

Draw

References
 http://www.itftennis.com/procircuit/players/player/profile.aspx?playerid=20006450

Tennis in Denmark
2008 ITF Women's Circuit